Aminobacter ciceronei is a bacterium from the genus of Aminobacter which was isolated from agricultural soil in California in the United States. Aminobacter anthyllidis has the ability to degrade Chloromethane and Bromomethane.

References

External links
Type strain of Aminobacter ciceronei at BacDive -  the Bacterial Diversity Metadatabase

Phyllobacteriaceae
Bacteria described in 2005